The 2019 Toyota/Save Mart 350 was a Monster Energy NASCAR Cup Series race held on June 23, 2019 at Sonoma Raceway in Sonoma, California. To be contested over 90 laps on the  road course, it was the 16th race of the 2019 Monster Energy NASCAR Cup Series season.

The race was won by its defending champion Martin Truex Jr., marking his third overall victory at Sonoma. Truex also set the event's fastest average speed.

Report

Background

Sonoma Raceway, formerly Sears Point Raceway and Infineon Raceway is a  road course and drag strip located on the landform known as Sears Point in the southern Sonoma Mountains in Sonoma, California, USA. It is host to one of only three Monster Energy NASCAR Cup Series races each year that are run on road courses (the others being Watkins Glen International in Watkins Glen, New York and the road course layout for the Bank of America 500 at Charlotte Motor Speedway). It is also host to the NTT IndyCar Series and several other auto races and motorcycle races such as the American Federation of Motorcyclists series. Sonoma Raceway continues to host amateur, or club racing events which may or may not be open to the general public. The largest such car club is the Sports Car Club of America.

Entry list

 (i) denotes driver who are ineligible for series driver points.
 (R) denotes rookie driver.

Practice

First practice

Final practice

Qualifying

Qualifying results

Kyle Weatherman practiced and qualified the No. 15 for Ross Chastain, who was in Gateway for the Truck Series race.

Race

Stage results

Stage One
Laps: 20

Stage Two
Laps: 20

Final stage results

Stage Three
Laps: 50

Race statistics
 Lead changes: 7 among 5 different drivers
 Cautions/Laps: 2 for 6
 Red flags: 0
 Time of race: 2 hours, 42 minutes and 9 seconds
 Average speed:

Media

Television
The race was televised by FS1, as Fox's final Cup Series event of the season. It also marked Darrell Waltrip's final race as a full-time broadcaster, retiring after a 19-year career spent exclusively at Fox (although he has since made spot appearances, with the April 2022 Bristol round being one). Several drivers (particularly those who share numbers that Waltrip had used during his racing career) ran commemorative paint schemes paying tribute to Waltrip, with Matt DiBenedetto using a design inspired by Waltrip's Terminal Transport #95 from the 1970s, David Ragan using a design inspired by Waltrip's "chrome car" from 1997 (which Waltrip employed as part of his 25th anniversary season), and Ricky Stenhouse Jr. using a design inspired by Waltrip's Western Auto #17 from the 1990s.

Radio 
Radio coverage of the race was broadcast by the Performance Racing Network. PRN's broadcast of the race was simulcasted on Sirius XM NASCAR Radio. Doug Rice and Mark Garrow announced the race in the booth while the field was racing on the pit straightaway. Pat Patterson called the race from a stand outside of turn 2 when the field was racing up turns 2, 3 and 3a. Brad Gillie called the race from a stand outside of turn 7a when the field was racing through turns 4a and 7a. Doug Turnbull called the race when the field raced thru turns 8 and 9. Rob Albright called the race from a billboard outside turn 11 when the field was racing through turns 10 and 11. Heather Debeaux, Brett McMillan, Wendy Venturini and Jim Noble reported from pit lane during the race.

Standings after the race

Drivers' Championship standings

Manufacturers' Championship standings

Note: Only the first 16 positions are included for the driver standings.
. – Driver has clinched a position in the Monster Energy NASCAR Cup Series playoffs.

References

Toyota Save Mart 350
Toyota Save Mart 350
Toyota Save Mart 350
NASCAR races at Sonoma Raceway